St Patrick's College is a co-educational boarding school in Kokstad, in the heart of East Griqualand, KwaZulu Natal, South Africa.

References

External links 
 

Private schools in KwaZulu-Natal
Boarding schools in South Africa
Nondenominational Christian schools in South Africa
Kokstad